Kaushik Roy is a researcher and educator in the area of electrical and computer engineering. He is a Fellow of the Institute of Electrical and Electronics Engineers and holds the position of Edward G. Tiedemann, Jr., Distinguished Professor of Electrical and Computer Engineering at Purdue University. Roy is the Director of the Center for Brain-Inspired Computing (C-BRIC).

Education 
Roy earned his B.Tech. degree in Electronics & Electrical Engineering from the IIT, Kharagpur India in 1983. He earned his Ph.D. degree under the supervision of Jacob Abraham in the area of Electrical and Computer Engineering from the University of Illinois at Urbana-Champaign in 1990.

Career 
From 1990-1993, Roy was a member of the technical staff in the Semiconductor Process and Design Center at Texas Instruments in Texas. He joined Purdue University in the College of Engineering in 1993 as an Assistant Professor of Electrical Engineering on the West Lafayette campus in Indiana. In 1997, he was promoted to associate professor. He was promoted to full professor in 2001 and was named the Roscoe H. George Professor of Electrical Engineering. In 2012, he was named the Edward G. Tiedemann, Jr., Distinguished Professor.

He has supervised 100 Ph.D. dissertations and co-authored two books on Low Power CMOS VLSI Design (John Wiley & McGraw Hill).

As of April 2021, Roy had 20 patents and more than 800 publications in books, journals and conferences that have been cited more than 59,000 times.

Honors and awards 
His research was recognized with the Purdue University Arden L. Bement Jr. Award for significant accomplishments in pure and applied science and engineering.

References 

IIT Kharagpur alumni
Grainger College of Engineering alumni
Purdue University faculty

Year of birth missing (living people)
Living people
Electrical engineering academics
Fellow Members of the IEEE
University of Illinois Urbana-Champaign alumni
Texas Instruments people